Ixcatepec is a municipality in Veracruz, Mexico.

The municipality of Ixcatepec is delimited to the north and north-east by Chontla, to the west by Tantoyuca, to the south by Chicontepec de Tejeda and to the south-east by Tepetzintla.

It produces principally maize, beans and sugarcane.

In Ixcatepec, in August takes place the celebration in honor to Virgen de la Asunción, Patron of the town.

The weather in Ixcatepec is very warm to hot all year with rains in summer and autumn.

References

External links

  Municipal Official webpage

Municipalities of Veracruz